Pierre Louis Maupertuis (1698–1759) was a French mathematician and philosopher.

Maupertuis  may also refer to:

Maupertuis Bay, a bay on Kangaroo Island in South Australia
Maupertuis (crater), a lunar crater (named after Pierre Louis Maupertuis)
Maupertuis' principle, a formulation of the principle of least action
Maupertuis, Manche, a commune in Manche, France
Maupertus-sur-Mer, a commune in Manche, France
Nouaillé-Maupertuis, near the site of the 1356 Battle of Poitiers and occasionally lending its name to that battle
Maleperduis, Malperduys or Maupertuis, the fictional lair of Reynard the Fox

See also
Malpertuis, a horror novel by the Belgian author Jean Ray